Şaban Özdemir (born , 1981) is a Turkish journalist and tv producer. The producer and anchorman of Pros Cons and Life is a choice.  Since September 2015 he's also the anchorman for Take Care of Yourself health tv show.

References 

1981 births
Living people
Turkish journalists
People from Akçaabat
Selçuk University alumni